On the Wings of Love is a 2015 Philippine romantic comedy drama television series directed by Antoinette Jadaone and Jojo Saguin and starring James Reid and Nadine Lustre in their first primetime television series. The series aired on ABS-CBN's Primetime Bida evening block and worldwide on The Filipino Channel from August 10, 2015, to February 26, 2016, replacing Bridges of Love and was replaced by The Story of Us.

The romantic comedy centers around two people — Clark, a boy living his American life, and Leah, a simple girl with an American dream, who are forced to marry in order to legally stay and continue working in the United States.

The show ended on February 26, 2016, and this episode was divided into two parts: a recorded segment and followed by a live viewing party in Ynares Center, Antipolo. It was also simulcasted live on ABS-CBN and worldwide on The Filipino Channel.

Plot
Leah Olivar (Nadine Lustre) grew up in a very poor, but happy family. When she was 12 years old, her mother, Rona (Isay Alvarez), goes to the United States to work towards a better future for their family. Life eventually becomes better for Leah, her sister, Tiffany (Bianca Manalo), and their father, Sol (Joel Torre). However, a tragedy changes their lives forever. For Leah, Rona's death creates a desire for her to go to the America and fulfill her mother's "American dream".

Ten years later, this dream comes true as Leah gets her visa to compete in a choir competition in San Francisco, California. After the contest, Leah extends her stay in San Francisco with the intention of visiting her mother's grave, and to find a way to legally work in the United States. However, to Leah's surprise, her mother's grave was nowhere to be found, and as her visa expires, finding a job that would allow her to remain in the United States also becomes elusive.

With the urging of Jack (Cherry Pie Picache), the mother of Leah's ex-boyfriend, Jigs (Albie Casiño), and out of desperation, Leah agrees to a marriage of convenience so that she could get her visa. But with Leah's limited resources, it will be hard for Jack to find her a partner. The only suitable person that would agree to the small amount that Leah is willing to pay is Jack's nephew, Clark (James Reid), who has been living in San Francisco for the past 11 years. His life has been full of heartbreaks as he went to the United States with his mother, Ofelia (Katya Santos), to be introduced to his American father, Kenneth. Soon after, Kenneth refuses to recognize Clark as his son, and Ofelia then suddenly dies. Clark gets placed into foster homes, where he was regularly abused. Later, because of his love for his siblings in the Philippines, Clark persevered and managed to survive life in the U.S. These misfortunes and responsibilities in life deprived Clark of romantic love.

Despite their disastrous first meeting, Leah and Clark spend time as a fake couple and learn about each other's past, quirks and habits, in order to pass the Immigration and Naturalization Service (INS) interview. As time passes, Leah and Clark discover a certain fondness for each other. They also realize that both have the same goals in life and that is to make a better life for their family.

They also start to sympathize with each other, as both reveal their deepest secrets. Soon, the sham marriage between Leah and Clark becomes real.

Cast and characters

Main cast 

 James Reid as Clark Medina
 Nadine Lustre as Leah Olivar-Medina
 
 Cherry Pie Picache as Jacqueline "Jack" Fausto
 Joel Torre as Soliman "Sol" Olivar
 Nanette Inventor as Pacita "Lola Pachang / Ima" Magtoto-Fausto
 Isay Alvarez as Veronica "Rona" Martinez-Olivar / Wyatt

Very Special Role
 Paulo Avelino as Simon Evangelista

Supporting cast 
 Albie Casiño as Diego "Jigs" Fausto
 Bianca Manalo as Tiffany Olivar-Carpio
 Nico Antonio as Antonio "Tolayts" Carpio
 Thou Reyes as Denzel 
 Jason Francisco as Cullen
 
 Paolo O'Hara as Abet Fausto
 Jordan Castillo as Romer Fausto
 Ruby Ruiz as Lolit Carpio
 Joel Saracho as Mama Lulu
 Geraldine Villamil as Kapitana
 Juan Miguel Severo as Rico
 Cheska Iñigo as Diana Stevens
 Kyle Echarri as Brent Wyatt
 Ysabel Ortega as Angela Stevens-Fausto
 Andre Garcia as Jordan Medina
 Laiza Comia as Jennifer "Jenny" Medina
 Nhikzy Calma as Gabriel "Gabby" Olivar Carpio / Gabriel "Gabby" Velasco
 Benj Manalo as Axel
 Rafael "Paeng" Sudayan as Kiko
 Jhustin Agustin as Rodolfo
 Vivien Benjamin

Introducing
 Bailey May as Harry Fausto
 Ylona Garcia as Audrey Olivar
 Ynna Asistio as Maggie Regalado

Guest cast 
 Matt Evans as Adrian Velasco
 Lee O'Brian as Arthur Wyatt
 Miguel Faustmann as Kenneth
 Anna Luna as Juliet Perez
 Japo Parcero as Monette
 Paul Cabral as Wedding Gown Designer
 Mark McMahon as Ethan
 James Vincent Martinez as Andres Suntay
 Anne Curtis as Herself
 Jobelle Salvador as Flora Evangelista

Special participation 
 Katya Santos as Ofelia Fausto-Medina
 Josh Ford as Young Clark Medina
 Avery Balasbas as Young Leah Olivar
 Trajan Moreno as Young Diego "Jigs" Fausto
 Belle Mariano as Young Tiffany Olivar

Production

Casting
On the Wings of Love was the brainchild of Coco Martin based on his experiences as an OFW in Canada. The concept was originally supposed to be a movie starring Martin and superstar Nora Aunor but she turned down the role of Martin's mother as she was busy doing other projects. The film with Martin and Aunor would eventually be released in 2016 under the title Padre de Familia, starring Martin and Aunor. This concept would again be revisited by Martin in his 2022 Metro Manila Film Festival entry, Labyu with an Accent.

With the film's release then uncertain, the concept was turned into a teleserye which necessitated a change in the female lead to co-star with Martin. Judy Ann Santos was approached to be Martin's leading lady. Santos, however, turned down the offer due to unexpected pregnancy. Sarah Geronimo was also approached for the role of leading lady but also had to turn down the offer due to scheduling conflicts. Martin also ended up being busy with his teleserye, Ang Probinsyano.

Finally, the roles were given to James Reid and Nadine Lustre which marks their first lead roles in a teleserye as they signed exclusive contracts with ABS-CBN.

Originally, the role of Jiggs was to be played by Arjo Atayde. Atayde's casting has gone as far as the look test when he was pulled out of the show to play Joaquin Tuazon, the main antagonist of Ang Probinsyano. Albie Casiño would eventually bag the role of Jiggs.

Soundtrack
In March 2015, R&B singer Kyla recorded two cover versions of the series' eponymous theme song originally sung by Jeffrey Osborne and later covered by Regine Velasquez. The original version and its music video was released on May 16, 2015, via YouTube, while the alternate version is a piano cover.

The theme song's original version is also part of the volume one of Dreamscape Televisions of Love album and Kyla's 15th anniversary compilation album My Very Best.

Reception

Ratings

Awards and nominations

Controversies

"Dancing Police" Scene
In an episode, Clark (character of James Reid) pretends to arrest, handcuff and blindfold his wife Leah (character of Nadine Lustre). Leah was shocked that her husband Clark was dancing while wearing a police uniform. Later on, a scene was made to show how they were sorry for making the police feel offended about the scene.

Reruns
Reruns of the show's episodes began airing on Jeepney TV on June 26, 2017.

On March 16, 2020, On the Wings of Love returned to air, temporarily replacing Make It with You as part of the temporary programming changes on ABS-CBN due to the quarantine caused by the COVID-19 pandemic. This rerun was abruptly cut due to the temporary closure of ABS-CBN following the cease and desist order issued by the National Telecommunications Commission on account of its franchise expiration. As of June 5, 2020, On the Wings of Love was no longer a temporary replacement due to the cancellation of Make It with You and replaced by The World of a Married Couple on June 15, 2020, on Kapamilya Channel's Primetime Bida Weeknight block.

All full episodes of On the Wings of Love are currently uploaded on ABS-CBN Entertainment YouTube Channel every Monday to Friday at 8:00 pm.

Reruns of the show's episodes began airing on PIE Channel (BEAM TV subchannel) on August 22, 2022, from 12:00 pm to 12:45 pm from Mondays to Fridays, and from 12:00 pm to 3:00 pm on Saturdays.

International broadcast
  Kenya – NTV (December 18, 2017 - April 7, 2018)
  Indonesia – MNCTV (November 21, 2016 - January 22, 2017)
  Thailand – Channel 3 (March 6, 2017 - June 20, 2017)

See also
 List of ABS-CBN drama series
 List of programs broadcast by Jeepney TV

References

External links

Fan Page
Official trailer

ABS-CBN drama series
Philippine romantic comedy television series
2015 Philippine television series debuts
2016 Philippine television series endings
Television series by Dreamscape Entertainment Television
Television shows filmed in California
Television shows filmed in the Philippines
Filipino-language television shows